Basanti (translation: Lady like a Spring) is a 2000 Nepali historical romantic film directed by Neer Shah. The cast includes Karishma Manandhar, Rajesh Hamal, Gauri Malla and Ashok Sharma. This movie is based on a novel of the same name written by one of the prominent Nepalese novelists Diamond Shumsher Rana, who fictionalized a love story on a historical plot. The film met with huge positive response from critics and audience with praise directed towards performance of the cast and direction of Shah. The film was a big commercial success at the box office. The film is considered as one of the best film ever made in Nepali cinema history and the best movie in the historical movie genre. Official Basanti Movie

Plot
The film explains the love story of Basanti (Karishma Manandhar), a palace maid, and Gagan Singh Bhandari (Rajesh Hamal), a Nepalese General and Kaji. The film also shows cold blooded murder of Mathabar Singh Thapa, the first titled Prime Minister of Nepal. The film ends with the tragic incident of Kot massacre upon which Jang Bahadur Kunwar (Neeraj Thapa) rises as Prime Minister of Nepal.

Cast
 Karishma Manandhar as Basanti/ Meethu, Gagan Singh's love interest
 Rajesh Hamal as Kaji Gagan Singh Bhandari 
 Gauri Malla as Queen Rajya Lakshmi Devi
Neeraj Thapa as Kaji Jung Bahadur Kunwar Rana
 B.S. Rana as King Rajendra Bikram Shah
 Ashok Sharma as Silange
Kiran K.C. as Ghyabrin
Rajaram Paudel as Khadananda Baje
Pawan Mainali as Dambar Bahadur Bista
Divya Dutta as Malati
Subhadra Adhikari as Mishri Aama

Song
The Song 'Fagu Ho Fagu Ho' is one of the most popular Holi Song in Nepal. The song has playback singer Gyanu Rana, Devika Pradhan, Rajesh Payal Rai. The movie also features other songs and playback singer for the movie are Lochan Bhattarai, Uday Khanal, Sworupraj Acharya, Rupkumar Rathod.

See also

Cinema of Nepal
List of Nepalese films
Seto Bagh

References

External links
 

2000 films
2000s Nepali-language films
2000 romantic drama films
Films based on Nepalese novels
Films shot in Kathmandu
Nepalese drama films
Films about Jung Bahadur Rana
Cultural depictions of Nepalese women
Nepalese films based on actual events
Nepalese historical films